Diego Ramirez de Guzman ( –1508) became  the bishop of Catania, Italy on 26 June 1500, after having been promoted previously to bishop of Lugo, Spain, on 7 February 1500.  He replaced there Spanish bishop Francisco Desprats,  (Appointed 14 Feb 1498 – 9 February 1500 Appointed, Bishop of Astorga, Spain, on 9 February 1500).  He died there, Catania, 23 October  1508.

He was replaced by Spanish Aragonese friar, Jaime de Conchillos, appointed bishop of Catania on 25 February 1509, but who  was appointed Bishop of Lérida, or bishop of Lleida, in the actual Catalan language, on 1 October 1512, under the ruling of his master, king Ferdinand II of Aragon, king of Naples and king of Sicily, also, between other titles.

References

External links and additional sources
 (for Chronology of Bishops) 
 (for Chronology of Bishops) 
 (for Chronology of Bishops) 
 (for Chronology of Bishops) 

Bishops of Catania
1508 deaths
15th-century Roman Catholic bishops in Castile
16th-century Italian Roman Catholic bishops
Grand Inquisitors of Spain
Year of birth unknown